Cóndor Huasi (from Quechua Kuntur Wasi, kuntur condor, wasi house, "condor house") is a village and municipality in Catamarca Province in northwestern Argentina.

References

Populated places in Catamarca Province